Uvariodendron kirkii is a species of flowering plant in the family Annonaceae. It is found in Kenya and Tanzania.

References

kirkii
Vulnerable plants
Flora of Kenya
Flora of Tanzania
Taxonomy articles created by Polbot